Edward Bianchi (born April 24, 1942) is an American television director and producer. He is better known for his work on Deadwood, Boardwalk Empire, Yellowstone, and The Get Down.

Career
Prior to Deadwood, Bianchi directed several music videos for Luther Vandross and the dance title sequence of each season of The Cosby Show.

From 1976 to 1995 he directed hundreds of commercials for clients such as: American Express, Pepsi Cola, Coca-Cola, Dr. Pepper, Eastern Airlines, Jello Pudding and the Jamaica Tourist Board. Bianchi won every major Commercial award including in 1985 "The Director's Guild Award" for The Best commercial Director of the year.

Bianchi directed Homicide Life on the Street in 1998 for creator Tom Fontana. It was his first TV  show as a director.  In 2002 he went on to direct the drama "The Wire " the HBO series created by David Simon. It told the story of the drugs wars in Baltimore MD. He directed 4 episodes including ep 105 "The Wire".

Bianchi joined the crew of Deadwood of the HBO western drama Deadwood as a director for the first season in 2004. The series was created by David Milch and focused on a growing town in the American West. Bianchi directed the episodes "The Trial of Jack McCall" and "No Other Sons or Daughters". Bianchi was hired as a producer for the second season in 2005 and continued to regularly direct episodes. He directed the two part season premiere "A Lie Agreed Upon", "Amalgamation and Capital" and the season finale "Boy-the-Earth-Talks-To". Bianchi and the production staff were nominated for the Emmy Award for Outstanding Drama Series at the 57th Primetime Emmy Awards for their work on the second season. Bianchi left the production staff after the second season but returned as a director for the third and final season in 2006. He directed the episodes "Full Faith and Credit" and "Leviathan Smiles".
In 2011 he joined the show creator Mitch Glazer as co executive producer of the STARZ's original series  Magic City. It focus on the hotel business in 1959 in Miami Beach. He directed 4 of the 8 episodes in the first season and season 4 - Episode 13, “Toast Can’t Never Be Bread”

Bianchi is married to Carla Bianchi who appeared on Deadwood as the character of Mary Stokes and in Magic City as the character Peggy Reef. The couple have three children: Adam, Alan and Stella.

Filmography

Film and Television
Director

References

External links

American film directors
American television directors
1942 births
Living people
Advertising directors